Mathias F. Correa (March 4, 1910 – December 5, 1963) was a pioneer in U.S. intelligence, lawyer and prosecutor.  Served as Acting United States Attorney (March–July 1941) and was appointed by President Franklin D. Roosevelt as United States Attorney for the Southern District of New York (July 1941 – June 10, 1943).

He graduated from Fordham University, A.B., 1931 and Columbia Law School, LL.B., 1934. As an Assistant United States Attorney, he was a member of the trial team in the prosecution of former United States Circuit Judge Martin T. Manton. During the Second World War, he worked in OSS counterintelligence in Italy. Later, holding the rank of major, he was a liaison between the U.S. Army and Secretary of the Navy James Forrestal, and was present for the raising of the flag at Mount Suribachi, Iwo Jima. After the War, he served as Special Assistant to the Secretary of the Navy; member, National Security Council Survey Committee.

With Allen Dulles and William H. Jackson, he was appointed by President Harry S. Truman to conduct a study of the newly created CIA and co-authored a report to the National Security Council on the CIA and the National Organization for Intelligence. He was a partner at the firm later known as Cahill Gordon & Reindel from 1946–1963 and argued before the Supreme Court in United States v. Procter & Gamble Co. as lead counsel for Colgate-Palmolive.

Correa died of an internal hemorrhage at United Hospital in Port Chester, New York, in 1963.

References

External links
 

1910 births
1963 deaths
Fordham University alumni
Columbia Law School alumni
United States Attorneys for the Southern District of New York
People associated with Cahill Gordon & Reindel
Cuban emigrants to the United States